Wiregrass Ranch High School is a Pasco County public school, in Wesley Chapel, Florida, U.S..

This was the first new high school in Pasco County in seven years, and was built to relieve overcrowding primarily at Wesley Chapel High School. In the first part of the 2006/2007 school year, it was based in portables behind Thomas E. Weightman Middle School and used many of their facilities, such as their cafeteria and media center, before the permanent facility opened in January 2007.

On November 23, 2019, the Wiregrass Ranch Marching Bulls won the FMBC Florida State Class 4A Championships, becoming the first marching band in Pasco County to do so, and placed third in the entire state as well.

Notable alumni
 John Gant, MLB pitcher for the St. Louis Cardinals
Ian Flores, 2018 All American, 2018 High School State Soccer Player of the Year, United Soccer Coaches

Austin Drury, Drafted to the Los Angeles Dodgers, Left handed Pitcher Austin Drury Stats, Fantasy & News

References

External links 
Wiregrass Ranch High School

High schools in Pasco County, Florida
Public high schools in Florida
Educational institutions established in 2006
2006 establishments in Florida